This is a list of tornadoes confirmed that occurred during the tornado outbreak of April 14–16, 2011.

Confirmed tornadoes

April 14 event

April 15 event

April 16 event

See also
Enhanced Fujita scale
List of United States tornadoes in April 2011
List of tornadoes in the 2011 Super Outbreak

References

Notes

04-14
Tornado outbreak